Helen Sutermeister (1943 or 1944 - 1979) was a historian and archaeologist involved in the program of Industrial Archaeology in Ontario. Sutermeister was Curatorial Assistant in the Canadiana Department of Royal Ontario Museum, and was a founding “member of the Norwich Survey within the Centre of East Anglian Studies”. Since her early death (due to lung cancer), the Helen Sutermeister Memorial Fund was created and Helen Sutermeister memorial lectures are given at the Centre of East Anglian Studies of the University of East Anglia. After returning from Canada she married (Ian Dunn, archivist in Chester) and settled in Loddon Norfolk whilst working at the University of East Anglia.

1979 deaths
People associated with the University of East Anglia
Year of birth uncertain